Jens Reimers (15 August 1941 – 19 November 2001) was a German track and field athlete. He competed in the men's discus throw at the 1968 Summer Olympics.

References

External links

1941 births
2001 deaths
German male discus throwers
West German male discus throwers
Olympic male discus throwers
Olympic athletes of West Germany
Athletes (track and field) at the 1968 Summer Olympics
Japan Championships in Athletics winners